Bill Easley (born January 13, 1946) is an American jazz musician who plays saxophone, flute, and clarinet.

Early life and education 
Easley was born and raised in Olean, New York. He began playing music at the age of 13 and studied at Memphis State University during the 1960s.

Career 
Easley worked with George Benson in the late 1960s and with Isaac Hayes in the 1970s. He also did sessions at Stax and Hi Records (with Ann Peebles and Al Green). He moved back to New York in 1980.

He has worked with Roland Hanna, Jimmy McGriff, Jimmy Smith, Ruth Brown, James Williams, Bill Mobley, George Caldwell, Mulgrew Miller, Grady Tate, Victor Gaskin, Panama Francis, Mercer Ellington, and Billy Higgins.

Discography
 Wind Inventions (Sunnyside, 1986)
 First Call (Milestone, 1990)
 Easley Said (Evidence, 1997)
 Business Man's Bounce (18th & Vine, 2007)
 Hearing Voices (18th and Vine, 2008)
 Love Stories  (American Showplace, 2010)

As sideman
With Mercer Ellington
 Duke Ellington's Sophisticated Ladies (RCA, 1981)
 Music is My Mistress (Music Masters, 1988)
With Jimmy McGriff
 City Lights (JAM, 1981)
Movin' Upside the Blues (JAM, 1982)
 Skywalk (Milestone, 1984)
 Blue to the 'Bone (Milestone, 1988)
 You Ought to Think About Me (Headfirst, 1990)
McGriff's House Party (Milestone, 2000)
 Feelin' It (Milestone, 2000)
McGriff Avenue (Milestone, 2002)
With Warren Vaché
Talk to Me Baby (Muse, 1996)
With James Williams
 Flying Colors (Zim, 1977)
 Alter Ego (Sunnyside, 1984)
 Progress Report (Sunnyside, 1985)
 Memphis Convention (DIW, 1992)

With others
 Jimmy Witherspoon, Sings the Blues (Black & Blue, 1980)
 Benny Carter, Central City Sketches (MusicMasters, 1987)
 Bobby Watson, The Year of the Rabbit (New Note, 1987)
 Charles Earland, Front Burner (Milestone, 1988)
 Ed Thigpen, BWay (Alpha Jazz, 1989)
 Grady Tate, Dream Love (All Art, 1989)
 Joey DeFrancesco, Where Were You? (Columbia, 1990)
 Etta Jones, Christmas with Etta Jones (Muse, 1990)
 Randy Johnston, Walk On (Muse, 1992)
 Grady Tate, TNT Grady Tate Sings (Milestone, 1991)
 Dakota Staton, Darling Please Save Your Love for Me (Muse, 1991)
 Jimmy Heath, Little Man Big Band, (Verve, 1992)
 Harold Mabern The Leading Man (DIW, 1993)
 Chris Connor, I Walk With Music (HighNote, 2002)

References

External links
 Official site

African-American jazz musicians
African-American saxophonists
American session musicians
American male saxophonists
American flautists
Living people
University of Memphis alumni
1946 births
21st-century American saxophonists
21st-century American male musicians
American male jazz musicians
Sunnyside Records artists
21st-century African-American musicians
20th-century African-American people
People from Olean, New York
People from Cattaraugus County, New York
21st-century flautists